Robin McGill Startup (22 July 1933 – 16 February 2012) was a New Zealand philatelist who signed the Roll of Distinguished Philatelists in 2008.

References

New Zealand philatelists
Signatories to the Roll of Distinguished Philatelists
1933 births
2012 deaths
Fellows of the Royal Philatelic Society London